Free as the Wind is a studio album by The Crusaders issued in December 1976 on MCA Records.
The album rose to No. 8 on the Billboard Top Soul Albums chart.

Tracklisting
Adapted from album's text.

Personnel
Adapted from album's text.
Robert "Pops" Popwell - bass
Stix Hooper - drums, percussion
Arthur Adams (track: B4), Dean Parks, Larry Carlton, Roland Bautista (tracks: B1, B3) - guitar
Joe Sample - keyboards, string and horn orchestration 
Paulinho Da Costa - percussion (track: B1)
Ralph MacDonald - special percussion
Wilton Felder - saxophone
Technical
Rik Pekkonen - engineer, mixing
Frank Mulvey - art direction
Tim Ritchie - album design
Ed Simpson - photography

Charts

References

1976 albums
The Crusaders albums
MCA Records albums
Albums produced by Stewart Levine